Little Superstar is a video uploaded on YouTube, which is a clip from the 1990 Tamil film Adhisaya Piravi, starring Rajinikanth. The clip features the Tamil actor King Kong (not to be confused with Thavakalai), and another Indian dwarf actor, E. Shankar (also known as King Kong) breakdancing to MC Miker G & DJ Sven's "Holiday Rap". Various mashups have also appeared on the Internet using tracks from Cypress Hill, Michael Jackson and others, including Ted's Fear Factory video. The first site to feature Little Superstar and give the clip its name was Dorks.com.

The video has been featured on YouTube, in Tom Anderson's bulletins on Myspace, on the E! TV show The Soup, the MSNBC shows Countdown with Keith Olbermann and Tucker Carlson, G4TV's Attack of the Show! and elsewhere, as well as having been parodied on Saturday Night Live. Another popular video clip features King Kong (not E. Shankar) slapping a man from the same film.

In recent years, actor King Kong (E. Shankar) has choreographed a dance number in a Doritos Tandoori Sizzler! commercial shown in Canada, which was filmed in India.

Transcript of the video

Dancing clip
Mother: Hey, hey. What's with the party early morning? Get out everybody, shoo, shoo. [Speaking to Rajinikanth, who's lying on the cot] Why not take some rest, dear?

Rajinikanth: OK Mom [lights up a beedi as she walks away].

King Kong: Dude, give me a beedi.

Rajinikanth: Hey! Kids shouldn't smoke.

King Kong: Buddy, I'm ten years older than you. Give it to me I say.

Rajinikanth: And if I don't?

King Kong: I'll skin you alive.

Rajinikanth: Here you go.

Slapping clip
King Kong: Brother, you don't worry about this silly duel. I'll take care of this myself (with my hands).

Rajinikanth: Ok.

(King Kong slaps thug)

King Kong: [pauses and looks at Rajinikanth] Dude, how (am I doing)?

Rajinikanth: Great!

Rajinikanth: Enough. He's going to die!

[King Kong returns to cot]

Rajinikanth: Well, is this enough or do you want a piece of me too?

Misconceptions
The clips were incorrectly reported as being from Bollywood, which predominantly refers to the filmmaking industry of Hindi films, in some places on the web and TV media, such as YouTube, Yahoo and the "Oddball Plays of the Month" segment of the Keith Olbermann show on MSNBC. The film is actually from Tamil cinema, colloquially known as Kollywood, the Tamil filmmaking industry based in Chennai, Tamil Nadu, India.

King Kong has been incorrectly described as a child actor in some places. He is actually an adult with dwarfism. He was also never known as a "little superstar" in the Tamil film industry and is only the title of the clip given by its uploaders.

In popular culture
A parody version of Little Superstar starring porn star Ron Jeremy first started turning up on video sharing websites in March 2007. Another parody starring Fred Armisen as King Kong and Bill Hader as Rajinikanth aired on Saturday Night Live on 21 April 2007. Nobody's Watching also created a parody of the video. A parody of Little Superstar appeared in the season finale "Gorillas in the Mist" of the sixth season of American Dad!. It was also cited by Bobby Moynihan as a source of inspiration for SNL's "Haunted Elevator" sketch, which aired in late 2016 and featured noted character David S. Pumpkins.

References

External links
"Little Superstar Returns" on YouTube
Doritos Tandoori Sizzlin commercial
Behind the scenes footage of the Doritos Tandoori Sizzler commercial
Adhisaya Piravi
Slapping scene
Fight scene
Countdown with Keith Olbermann 29 September 2006
Tucker Carlson 28 September 2006

Internet memes introduced in 2006
2006 YouTube videos
Viral videos
Tamil cinema